Javier "Javi" Mier Martínez (born 3 February 1999) is a Spanish footballer who plays for Real Oviedo as a central midfielder.

Club career
Born in Oviedo, Asturias, Mier was a Real Oviedo youth graduate. He made his senior debut with the reserves on 2 September 2017, starting in a 1–0 Tercera División away win against TSK Roces.

Mier scored his first senior goal on 13 May 2018, netting his side's only in a 1–2 loss at CD Llanes. He contributed with one goal in 14 appearances, as the B-side returned to Segunda División B after 16 years.

Mier made his first team debut on 5 January 2020, starting in a 1–1 home draw against Málaga CF in the Segunda División.

International career
Mier is a youth international for Spain, representing the under-16s in 2014.

Personal life
Mier's twin brother Jorge is also a footballer who plays as a midfielder. Their older brother, Tato, was also an Oviedo youth graduate.

Career statistics

Club

References

External links

1999 births
Living people
Twin sportspeople
Spanish twins
Footballers from Oviedo
Spanish footballers
Association football midfielders
Segunda División players
Segunda División B players
Tercera División players
Real Oviedo Vetusta players
Real Oviedo players
Spain youth international footballers